The Joseph Carpenter Silversmith Shop is a historic building that was built between 1772 and 1774 on the green in Norwichtown, now a section of Norwich, Connecticut. The interior has a single brick chimney that was used for the forge, but it has been modified and adapted for modern use with modern doors, electric lighting and heat, and a disappearing overhead stairway that leads to the attic. Joseph Carpenter (1747–1804) was a successful of silversmith, clockmaker, and pewterer, and shared the building with his brother, a merchant. The shop was added to the National Register of Historic Places on October 6, 1970, and was listed as a contributory property for the Norwichtown Historic District on January 17, 1973.

Original occupants 

Born in 1747 to Joseph and Elizabeth Carpenter (née Lathrop), Joseph Carpenter was a successful silversmith in Norwich, Connecticut. The shop was constructed between 1772 and 1774 and Joseph shared it with his brother Gardner Carpenter, who operated a mercantile business from the shop. In 1775, Joseph Carpenter married Eunice Fitch, and they had six children. He died in 1804. Carpenter was noted to be one of the "most successful of the Norwich silversmiths, clockmakers and pewterers..."

Design 

Constructed between 1772 and 1774, the building was built on a stone foundation and has a stone stoop leading to the front entrance. The gambrel roof is framed without a ridge pole. At the time of the National Historic Register of Places nomination, the roof used wooden shingles. The interior has a single brick chimney that was used for the forge. The main floor was originally open, with only a single supporting post in the center, but this was later partitioned into several rooms. Modern additions to the shop include modern doors, electric lighting and heat, and a disappearing overhead stairway that leads to the attic. The shop's cellar was not described in the survey. In 1915, the house passed out of the Carpenter family, and it was restored by Norman Isham in 1916. In 1956, the building came into the ownership of the "Society of the Founders of Norwich, Connecticut, Inc.". According to the 1966 edition of Fodor's Modern Guides, the Joseph Carpenter Silversmith Shop was "still furnished as it was when Mr. Carpenter plied his trade." The National Historic Register of Places noted that the partitioning was "recent" at the time of its 1970 nomination. In 1997, a $5000 grant was used to replace the roof.

Importance 

The Joseph Carpenter Silversmith Shop is an example of a small frame silversmith's shop, and is believed to be the only surviving example in New England. The shop was added to the National Register of Historic Places on October 6, 1970 and it was listed as a contributory property for the Norwichtown Historic District on January 17, 1973. As early as 1917, the shop was the subject of a preservation effort. The shop was photographed by the Historic American Buildings Survey. The shop was featured as part of a historic house tour in 1993's "Reflections on the Past."

See also
National Register of Historic Places listings in New London County, Connecticut
Dr. Daniel Lathrop School, next door
Carpenter House (Norwich, Connecticut) - The house of Joseph Carpenter's brother, Gardner Carpenter.

References

External links

National Register of Historic Places in New London County, Connecticut
Historic American Buildings Survey in Connecticut
Buildings and structures in Norwich, Connecticut
Commercial buildings on the National Register of Historic Places in Connecticut
Historic district contributing properties in Connecticut